Scott William Meyer (born August 19, 1957) is a former catcher in Major League Baseball. He played for the Oakland Athletics in 1978.

References

External links

1957 births
Living people
Major League Baseball catchers
Oakland Athletics players
Baseball players from Illinois
People from Evergreen Park, Illinois
Western Michigan Broncos baseball players
Jersey City A's players
Waterbury A's players
West Haven A's players
West Haven Whitecaps players